Madan Lal is an Indian politician belonging to Aam Aadmi Party. He won as a Member of the Legislative Assembly from Kasturba Nagar constituency in Delhi. He was president of the Saket Court Bar Association. He is a Three Times MLA from Kasturba Nagar Assembly, he won three Consecutive Elections on Aam Aadmi Party Ticket in 2013, 2015 & 2020.

Electoral performance

References 
 

Aam Aadmi Party politicians from Delhi
Living people
Delhi MLAs 2013–2015
Delhi MLAs 2015–2020
Delhi MLAs 2020–2025
Year of birth missing (living people)